This is a list of Belgian television related events from 2000.

Events
18 February - Nathalie Sorce is selected to represent Belgium at the 2000 Eurovision Song Contest with her song "Envie de vivre". She is selected to be the forty-third Belgian Eurovision entry during Eurosong held at the RTBF Studios in Brussels.
3 September - The Belgian version of Big Brother debuts on Kanaal Twee.
10 October - Ingrid Vervaeck wins the jackpot of BEF 20,000,000 in Wie wordt multimiljonair?.
17 December - The first season of Big Brother is won by Steven Spillebeen.
Unknown - Kürt Rogiers takes over from Bart Kaëll as host of VTM Soundmixshow
Unknown - Sonny Oroir wins the eleventh season of VTM Soundmixshow, performing as Celine Dion.

Debuts
3 September - Big Brother (2000-2007)
5 November - Big & Betsy (2000-2003)

Television shows

1990s
Samson en Gert (1990–present)
Familie (1991–present)
Wittekerke (1993-2008)
Thuis (1995–present)
Wie wordt multimiljonair? (1999-2002)
Wizzy & Woppy (1999-2007)

Ending this year
VTM Soundmixshow (1989-1995, 1997-2000)

Births

Deaths